Alone Against the Dark, subtitled "Defying the Triumph of the Ice", is an adventure published by Chaosium in 1985 for the Horror tabletop role-playing game based on the works of H.P. Lovecraft, Call of Cthulhu.  It was written by author Matthew J. Costello, and was the is the second Call of Cthulhu solo adventure published after Alone Against the Wendigo.  The adventure received positive reviews in game periodicals including White Dwarf, Different Worlds, and Space Gamer/Fantasy Gamer. Chaosium published a revised edition of the adventure in 2017.

Description

Plot summary
Alone Against the Dark is a Call of Cthulhu adventure for a single player, with no need for a referee. The player takes on the role of Professor Louis Grunewald of Miskatonic University, who receives a wire from his friend T. Gliere, who has been jailed in Athens for stealing an archaeological artifact. The adventure will take the Investigator to Athens, Cairo, Bremen, and Antarctica.

Gameplay
Blank Investigator sheets are provided. The player must first allocate a pool of points to the professor's skills, and a further 150 points to science skills such as Archaeology, Astronomy, and History. If Professor Grunewald is killed, the player will choose one of Grunewald's friends to continue the adventure: wealthy financier Ernest Hold; Nora McShane, ace reporter for the New York Daily Sun; or U.S. Navy Lieutenant Devon Wilson.

The player starts the adventure by reading the first paragraph of the adventure. All of the subsequent paragraphs are individually numbered; much like the Fighting Fantasy series of adventure books published by Games Workshop, decisions made by the player, or succeeding or failing at combat or skill dice rolls, will route the player to different paragraphs, providing a varying storyline depending on the choices, successes and failures the player makes.

Publication history

Alone Against the Dark was written by Matthew J. Costello, with art by and was published by Krawczyk in 1985 as 68-page book with a removable cardstock insert.

Chaosium originally published the horror role-playing game Call of Cthulhu in 1981. The first solo adventure, Alone Against the Wendigo was published in 1985, and was quickly followed the same year by a second solo adventure, Alone Against the Dark, a 82-page softcover book designed by Matthew J. Costello with artwork by Krawczyk.

In 2017, Alone Against the Dark was rewritten, expanded to 102 pages, and revised for the 7th edition of Call of Cthulhu by Matthew J. Costello and Mike Mason, with interior artwork by Dean Engelhardt, Loïc Muzy, and Jonathan Wyke, and cover art by Petr Štovik.

Reception
In the May 1986 edition of White Dwarf (Issue #77), Phil Frances was complimentary, noting, "Alone Against The Dark builds on the pattern of its predecessor, Alone Against the Wendigo, to further expand the horizons of lone adventuring. In fact it gets closer to 'true' role-playing than any other solo I can think of." Frances also liked the introductory paragraph provided for each Investigator, commenting that it "portrays them well enough for us to get a good idea of their personality, and adds welcome touches of flavour." He also liked the innovation that the player can leave the storyline for periods of time to buy supplies or rest. Frances concluded by giving this adventure an excellent overall rating of  9 out of 10, saying, "Alone Against the Dark encourages strategic play; careful planning of daily schedules is required to make the best of the limited time available."

In the November–December 1986 edition of Different Worlds (Issue #44), William A. Barton thought that Alone Against the Dark was even better than its predecessor, Alone Against the Wendigo, commenting that if designer Matthew Costello "hasn't yet perfected the genre, he's come very close with The Dark." Barton welcomed the addition of the telephone as an investigative tool, pointing out that "Since the investigators are, unknown to them, running against a sinister deadline [...] such a time-saving device is a welcome way to obtain additional information." Barton's only criticism of the adventure was the artwork, which he found "sketchy". He concluded by giving the adventure an excellent rating of 4.5 out of 5, saying, "Pick this one up at all costs — unless you absolutely hate solos, or don't play Cthulhu. And if you manage to complete it with fewer than the four Investigators provided, give yourself a pat on the back — or whatever piece of anatomy is left on your Investigator after the Old Ones and their minions finish with him."

In the February–March 1987 edition of Space Gamer/Fantasy Gamer (Issue No. 77), Lawrence Person commented "All in all, a thoughtful and engrossing adventure. Recommended for all COC players, and highly recommended for those who like Call of Cthulhu but can't find a regular campaign to play in."

Other reviews
 Alarums & Excursions July 1987 (Issue 143, p. 41)
 Abyss Spring 1986 (Issue 37, p. 5)

References

Call of Cthulhu (role-playing game) adventures
Role-playing game supplements introduced in 1985